The canton of Nanteuil-le-Haudouin is an administrative division of the Oise department, northern France. Its borders were modified at the French canton reorganisation which came into effect in March 2015. Its seat is in Nanteuil-le-Haudouin.

It consists of the following communes:
 
Acy-en-Multien
Antilly
Autheuil-en-Valois
Bargny
Baron
Betz
Boissy-Fresnoy
Borest
Bouillancy
Boullarre
Boursonne
Brégy
Chèvreville
Cuvergnon
Ermenonville
Étavigny
Ève
Fontaine-Chaalis
Fresnoy-le-Luat
Gondreville
Ivors
Lagny-le-Sec
Lévignen
Mareuil-sur-Ourcq
Marolles
Montagny-Sainte-Félicité
Montlognon
Nanteuil-le-Haudouin
Neufchelles
Ognes
Ormoy-le-Davien
Ormoy-Villers
Péroy-les-Gombries
Le Plessis-Belleville
Réez-Fosse-Martin
Rosières
Rosoy-en-Multien
Rouville
Rouvres-en-Multien
Silly-le-Long
Thury-en-Valois
Varinfroy
Ver-sur-Launette
Versigny
La Villeneuve-sous-Thury
Villers-Saint-Genest

References

Cantons of Oise